Eclipta bilineaticollis is a species of beetle in the family Cerambycidae. It was described by Dmytro Zajciw in 1965.

References

Eclipta (beetle)
Beetles described in 1965